Adakarası ("island's black"), is a Turkey origin of red grape variety. Its famous production place is Avşa Island but the grape variety of Adakara produces in all Marmara Region (especially Marmara coast and East Thrace). The wine has an alcohol ratio approximately 12%, and an acidity range of 6 to 7 grams/liter and this wine are also known as Avşa Wine. The Island of Avşa produce 1500 tonnes wine per a year.

See also
 Boğazkere
 Çalkarası
 Kalecik Karası
 Papazkarası
 Öküzgözü

References
 Hayyam.com - Red wine grape varieties grown in Turkey 
 avsa-goruntuleri.com - Wine Culture in Avşa 
 foodsofturkey.com - Indigenous red wine grapes of Turkey

Grape varieties of Turkey
Red wine grape varieties